Santos Benigno Laciar (born January 31, 1959), known familiarly as Santos Laciar and nicknamed Falucho, is an Argentine who was boxing's world flyweight and super flyweight champion.

Biography
Laciar was born in Huinca Renancó, in the province of Córdoba, Argentina.

Laciar began his career in his hometown, on December 3 of 1976, knocking out Carlos Maliene in four rounds. After three more wins, all by knockout, he was faced with Alejandro Holguin, who held him to a ten-round draw, becoming the first boxer to face Laciar and not come out on the losing end. After three more wins, he drew once again, this time against Jose Ibiris, but in his next fight, he was able to take the Córdoba State Flyweight title away from Carlos Reyes Sosa in Villa María with a 12-round decision. He finished 1977 with four more wins, including a knockout in six in a rematch with Reyes Sosa.

In 1978 he had 13 fights, for an average of slightly more than one fight per month. Among his fights that year: a rematch with Ibiris, which ended in a ten-round decision win for Laciar, two fights versus contender Ramon Soria, which ended in a draw and in Laciar's first defeat, a 10-round decision loss, a fight with Luis Gerez, who drew with Laciar, and Laciar's Buenos Aires debut, a 10-round decision win over Angel Luis Fernandez.

1979 was another busy year for Laciar, boxing 13 times again during that year. He won 9 of those bouts. Among his fights in '79, a loss to future world Junior bantamweight champion Gustavo Ballas, who beat him in 10 on points, a rubber match with Ibris, resulting in another Laciar 10-round decision win, two decision losses to Raúl Pérez,  and a 10-round decision win against top contender Federico Condori.

But early in 1980 Laciar started what would turn out to be a great decade for him. He was matched with Miguel Lanzarte on February 26 of that year for the vacant Argentinian flyweight title and won the bout by a decision in 12. After a draw in ten against Condori's brother Ruben, he won four straight bouts, and on August 30, he challenged for the South American flyweight title. In what was his first fight outside Argentina, he and South American champion Jaime Miranda battled to an 8-round no contest (a no contest is declared when circumstances beyond boxing cause the fight to be stopped) in Santiago, Chile. After one more win over Federico Condori, Miranda returned the favor by travelling to Laciar's country and this time, Laciar won the South American title with a 12-round decision win. Laciar finished the year by travelling to England, where he lost a 10-round decision to future world champion Charlie Magri.

In 1981, one day before his birthday, he beat Jose de la Cruz in Mar del Plata. He was already ranked number one by the WBA, and in March he flew to South Africa, where he beat Peter Mathebula on the 28th day of that month, by a knockout in seven rounds to become the world's flyweight champion. After the retirement of Carlos Monzón in 1977 and Victor Galindez in 1978, (Galindez died in 1980 in an auto race accident), Argentina was in need of a world champion boxer, and Laciar became a national hero instantly.

A rematch with Lanzarte, resulting in a 10-round non title decision win, followed, and then he fought at the Luna Park, where he lost his title to Luis Ibarra.

Ibarra lost his title in his first defense to Juan Herrera, and after 5 more bouts, Laciar challenged Herrera in the champion's hometown of Tampico, Mexico. Laciar recovered the crown by a knockout in 13 rounds, and this time, he wouldn't lose it again. He defended it for three years, after which he left it vacant. He defeated former world champion Betulio González in Maracaibo, Venezuela by a decision in 15, Steve Muchoki in Copenhagen, Denmark by a knockout in 13, Ramon Nery (a deaf-mute boxer) by a knockout in 9 at Córdoba, Shuichi Hozumi by a knockout in 2 in Japan, Hee Sup Chin, by a knockout in one in South Korea, Juan Herrera, in a rematch at Marsala, Italy, by a decision in 15, former world champion Prudencio Cardona by a knockout in 10 in Córdoba, former two-time world Junior Flyweight champion Hilario Zapata by a decision in 15 at Buenos Aires, and Antoine Monteiro, beaten by a knockout in 11 at Paris, France. After his fight with Monteiro, he decided to leave the world Flyweight championship vacant. His fame also surpassed the Argentinian borders and he became famous all over Latin America, The Ring's Spanish edition featuring him on the cover many times, as well as on posters and articles. He was also on the cover of Guantes magazine multiple times during his second period as champion.

On June 8, 1986, he and Jaime Miranda had a rubber match, Laciar winning a ten-round decision. Two months later, world Junior Bantamweight champion, Mexican Gilberto Roman, travelled to Argentina to defend his WBC and Lineal crown versus Laciar, the fight ending in a 12-round draw. Six more wins followed, including one against Hector Patri, and then on May 16 of 1987, he and Roman met again. This time the WBC chose a neutral place for the fight, but Laciar won the fight by a knockout in 11 at Reims, France, becoming a world champion for the third time. However, in his first title defense, Laciar was on the losing end of a decision against Colombian Sugar Baby Rojas in Miami.

Laciar kept on boxing and reeled off eight more straight wins, but on October 8, 1988, he was outpointed by Juan Carazo in Caguas, Puerto Rico, by a decision in 12 rounds. Two more wins and another no contest followed, and, after Carazo lost in his title try against Roman by decision, it was Laciar's turn to face the Mexican again. This time, they boxed in the Los Angeles suburb of Inglewood, California, and Roman came out victorious by a 12-round decision.

Roman would die in a car crash the next year, and all chances of a fourth bout between the two, which was a possibility that was being talked about, were dashed with Roman's death.

Laciar fought three more bouts, all in 1990, after which he decided to retire.

His final record was 79 wins, 10 losses, 11 draws and 1 fight ended in a no-contest, with 31 wins coming by knockout.

After retirement
Laciar became an occasional boxing commentator for TyC Sports's Saturday night boxing show, Boxeo de Primera.

Professional boxing record

See also
List of world flyweight boxing champions
List of world super-flyweight boxing champions

References

External links

Santos Laciar - CBZ Profile

 

|-

1959 births
Living people
Argentine male boxers
Sportspeople from Córdoba Province, Argentina
Flyweight boxers
Super-flyweight boxers
World flyweight boxing champions
World super-flyweight boxing champions
World Boxing Association champions
World Boxing Council champions
Boxing commentators